Thomas Farden (born Man-Ki Park; March 28, 1974) is an American college gymnastics coach. A native of Dayton, Minnesota, he began his career as the assistant coach of his alma mater the Southeast Missouri Redhawks women's program in 1999 until his promotion to head coach in 2003. After his departure in 2009, Farden briefly served as an assistant coach at the Arkansas Razorbacks for the 2010 season. However, in 2011, Farden became an assistant coach for the Utah Red Rocks team; a position he held until 2015 when, following the retirement of long-time leader Greg Marsden, he was made the co-head coach with Megan Marsden. After Marsden's retirement in 2019, Farden became the sole head coach of the program.

Life and career

1980–99: Career beginnings 
At the age of six, in 1980, Farden commenced gymnastics training – he participated as a competitor from the ages of 6 to 18, insisting he was never a good gymnast. However, in 1992, following graduation from Anoka High School, Farden started Spectrum Gymnastics in Anoka, Minnesota with Bill Corcoran and Bart Roskoski. However, the gym closed in 1996; he then started coaching at TAGS Gymnastics in Eden Prairie, Minnesota.

1999–2010: Coaching tenure at Southeast Missouri and brief spell at Arkansas 
In 1999, SEMO women's gymnastics head coach Patty Stotzheim asked Farden whether he'd want to work as her assistant; he took the job for a salary of $15,000. With the Redhawks program, he was a four-year assistant coach until, in May 2003, Farden was named the head coach of the Redhawks after Stotzheim left to attend law school. In his first season, the Redhawks finished fourth at the MIC Championships. In addition, Tara Boldt and Katie Bloom advanced to the NCAA Regionals in Lincoln, Nebraska and the team would finish ranked 46th.

Farden's Redhawks finished third at the 2006 MIC Championships and, unlike the previous season, garnered a team NCAA Regional birth, finishing the year at #35. The 2007 season didn't see the Redhawks earn a Regional birth either, despite the team's third-place finish at MIC Championships in Cape Girardeau, Missouri. The 2008 season, which would be Farden's penultimate at SEMO, was one of the best for Farden; the team finished second at the MIC Championships, and the team finished 5th at the South Central Regional (ahead of PAC 10 team ASU) and 30th Nationally. As a result, Farden was awarded NCAA Region Coach of the Year. Farden's final season in 2009 was another successful one under his reign; the program won the MIC Conference Championships and, consequently, the team did not qualify to regionals, finishing the year ranked 37th. From 2006 to 2009, Farden was awarded MIC Conference Coach of the Year.

He left the role to join the Arkansas Razorbacks program as an assistant coach. With Farden's help, the team to an eleventh-place finish at Nationals.

2011–present: Tenure with Utah

2011–15: Assistant coach 
On August 18, 2010; after only one season at Arkansas, it was revealed that Farden would be joining the Utah Red Rocks program as an assistant coach for the 2011 season. He was hired as a replacement for Jeff Graba, who took the head coach role for the Auburn Tigers women's gymnastics program.

Immediately after joining the Utah program, Farden headed as Utah's bars head coach; his work was highlighted through the second-place finish of Georgia Dabritz at the 2013 Nationals, and her latter National title in 2015. Additionally, in his first season, the program's national bars ranking shot from #12 to #3. Likewise, in 2015, Utah were co-leaders in the nation for the uneven bars, tied with Florida Gators.

2016–2019: Co-head coach 
Upon the retirement of Greg Marsden, the long-time head coach of the Red Rocks, Farden was appointed the co-Head Coach of the program along with Megan Marsden, long-time assistant coach and the spouse of Greg Marsden. In his first season in the role, Farden helped the Red Rocks finish fifth in the all-around during the regular season; the program's prowess was then solidified through their second-place finish at the 2016 Pac-12 Championships, in Seattle, Washington. However, the Red Rocks won the 2016 Regional to qualify to the 2016 NCAA Women's Gymnastics Championship in Fort Worth, Texas. In 2017 the success of the Red Rocks continued with a PAC 12 team title, NCAA regional championship and Super Six berth (5th place team). Also, freshman MyKayla Skinner was crowned NCAA floor champion and runner up in the AA.

2019: Head coach 
Upon Megan Marsden's retirement, Farden became the sole head coach of the Utah program.

In the 2020 season he led the program to its second undefeated season (1993 & 2020) and a regular season PAC 12 Championship.

For these accomplishments he was named PAC 12 coach and Regional coach of the year.

In 2021 season the Red Rocks claimed PAC-12 regular season and tournament titles, regional crown and a 3rd place finish at the NCAA’s.

In the 2022 season the Red Rocks claimed a share of the PAC-12 regular season and won outright the PAC 12 tournament title, regional crown and 3rd place finish at the NCAA's.

Personal life 
Born Man-Ki Park on March 28, 1974, Farden was adopted from South Korea (born in Incheon), as he was an orphan – insisting that he was 'left in a basket on the sidewalk'.

He is married to Christina Farden (née Faulkner), an alumna of Southeast Missouri State University. He and his wife have adopted a son from South Korea (the same region as Farden too) called Ki.

References 

1974 births
Utah Red Rocks coaches
American gymnastics coaches
Sportspeople from Incheon
American people of Korean descent
Living people
Anoka High School alumni
Sportspeople from Minnesota
Southeast Missouri State University alumni